Spain competed at the 2000 Summer Olympics in Sydney, Australia. 321 competitors, 216 men and 105 women, took part in 165 events in 27 sports.

Medalists

|  style="text-align:left; width:78%; vertical-align:top;"|

| width="22%" align="left" valign="top" |

Archery

Spain again sent only one archer to the Olympics. She was defeated by one point in the first round, despite being tied for the 10th highest score in the round.

Athletics

Men's competition
Men's 100 m
Venancio Jose
 Round 1 – 10.36
 Round 2 – 10.53 (→ did not advance)

Men's 200 m
Venancio Jose
 Round 1 – 20.95
 Round 2 – 20.79 (→ did not advance)

Men's 400 m
David Canal
 Round 1 – 45.53
 Round 2 – 45.54 (→ did not advance)

Men's 800 m
José Manuel Cerezo
 Round 1 – 01:48.11 (→ did not advance) 
Roberto Parra
 Round 1 – 01:48.19 (→ did not advance)

Men's 1.500 m
Andrés Manuel Díaz
 Round 1 – 03:38.54
 Semifinal – 03:38.41
 Final – 03:37.27 (→ 7th place) 
José Antonio Redolat
 Round 1 – 03:38.66
 Semifinal – 03:45.46 (→ did not advance)
Juan Carlos Higuero
 Round 1 – 03:40.60
 Semifinal – 03:38.37
 Final – 03:38.91 (→ 8th place)

Men's 5.000 m
Alberto García
 Round 1 – 14:11.65 (→ did not advance) 
Yousef El Nasri
 Round 1 – 13:34.49 (→ did not advance)

Men's 10.000 m
José Ríos
 Round 1 – 27:51.40
 Final – 28:50.31 (→ 18th place) 
Enrique Molina
 Round 1 – 28:09.76
 Final – DNF
Teodoro Cunado
 Round 1 – 29:10.90 (→ did not advance)

Men's 400 m hurdles
Iñigo Monreal
 Round 1 – 51.32 (→ did not advance)

Men's 4 × 400 m
Antonio Andres, David Canal, Inigo Monreal, Eduardo Iván Rodríguez
 Round 1 – 03:06.87 (→ did not advance)

Men's 3.000 m steeplechase
Luis Miguel Martín
 Round 1 – 08:24.04
 Final – 08:22.75 (→ 5th place) 
Eliseo Martín
 Round 1 – 08:24.97
 Final – 08:23.00 (→ 6th place) 
Marco Cepeda
 Round 1 – 08:40.01 (→ did not advance)

Men's shot put
Manuel Martínez
 Qualifying – 19.94
 Final – 20.55 (→ 6th place)

Men's discus
David Martinez
 Qualifying – 61.50 (→ did not advance)

Men's long jump
Yago Lamela
 Qualifying – 7.89 (→ did not advance)

Men's triple jump
Raul Chapado
 Qualifying – NM (→ did not advance)

Men's 20 km walk
Paquillo Fernández
 Final – 1:21:01 (→ 7th place) 
David Márquez
 Final – 1:24:36 (→ 20th place) 
José David Domínguez
 Final – 0:01:28 (→ 35th place)

Men's 50 km walk
Valentí Massana
 Final – 3:46:01 (→ 4th place) 
Jesús Ángel García
 Final – 3:49:31 (→ 12th place) 
Mikel Odriozola
 Final – 3:59:50 (→ 24th place)

Men's marathon
Martín Fiz
 Final – 2:13:06 (→ 6th place) 
Alberto Juzdado
 Final – 2:21:18 (→ 42nd place) 
Abel Antón
 Final – 2:24:04 (→ 53rd place)

Men's decathlon
Francisco Javier Benet
 100 m – 11.42
 Long jump – 6.32
 Shot put – DNS

Women's competition
Women's 400 m
Norfalia Carabali
 Round 1 – 52.36
 Round 2 – 52.63 (→ did not advance)

Women's 800 m
Mayte Martínez
 Round 1 – 01:59.60
 Semifinal – 02:03.27 (→ did not advance)

Women's 1.500 m
Nuria Fernández
 Round 1 – 04:11.46
 Semifinal – 04:10.92 (→ did not advance)
Natalia Rodríguez
 Round 1 – 04:22.82 (→ did not advance)

Women's 5.000 m
Marta Domínguez
 Round 1 – 15:45.07 (→ did not advance) 
Beatriz Santiago
 Round 1 – 15:31.94 (→ did not advance)

Women's 10.000 m
Maria Teresa Recio
 Round 1 – 33:36.44 (→ did not advance) 
Maria Abel
 Round 1 – 34:05.44 (→ did not advance)

Women's 4 × 400 m
Julia Alba, Miriam Bravo, Norfalia Carabali and Mayte Martínez
 Round 1 – 03:32.45 (→ did not advance)

Women's shot put
Martina de la Puente
 Qualifying – 16.30 (→ did not advance)

Women's discus
Alice Matějková
 Qualifying – 54.19 (→ did not advance)

Women's javelin throw
Marta Míguez
 Qualifying – 55.52 (→ did not advance)

Women's long jump
Concepción Montaner
 Qualifying – NM (→ did not advance)

Women's triple jump
Carlota Castrejana
 Qualifying – 13.76 (→ did not advance)

Women's high jump
Marta Mendía
 Qualifying – 1.89 (did not advance)

Women's pole vault
Mari Mar Sanchez
 Qualifying – 4.25 (did not advance)

Women's 20 km walk
María Vasco
 Final – 1:30:23 (→  Bronze medal)
Encarnacion Granados
 Final – 1:35:06 (→ 20th place) 
Eva Perez
 Final – 1:36:35 (→ 27th place)

Women's marathon
Ana Isabel Alonso
 Final – 2:36:45 (→ 30th place) 
Griselda González
 Final – 2:38:28 (→ 33rd place) 
Maria Luisa Munoz
 Final – 2:45:40 (→ 39th place)

Women's heptathlon
Inma Clopés
 100 m hurdles – 14.20
 High jump – 1.66
 Shot put – 12.70
 200 m – 26.25
 Long jump – NM
 Javelin throw – DNS

Basketball

Men's team competition
Preliminaries (1-4)
Defeated Angola (64-45)
Lost to Russia (63-71)
Lost to Canada (77-91)
Lost to Yugoslavia (65-78)
Lost to Australia (80-91)
Classification matches
9th-10th place: defeated China (84-64) → 9th place

Team roster
 Alberto Herreros
 Alfonso Reyes
 Carlos Jiménez
 Francisco Alberto Angulo
 Ignacio de Miguel
 Ignacio Rodríguez
 John Bernard Rogers
 Jorge Garbajosa
 Juan Carlos Navarro
 Raúl López
 Roberto Dueñas
 Rodrigo De la Fuente

Beach volleyball

Javier Bosma and Fabio Diez — 5th place (tied)

Boxing

Men's light flyweight (– 48 kg)
Rafael Lozano
Round 1 – bye 
Round 2 – defeated Danilo Lerio of Philippines
Quarterfinal – defeated Suleiman Wanjau Bilali of Kenya
Semifinal – defeated Un Chol Kim of DPR of Korea
Final – lost to Brahim Asloum of France →  Silver medal

Canoeing

Flatwater

Men's competition
Men's kayak singles 500 m
Jovino Gonzalez
 Qualifying heat – 01:40.761
 Semifinal – 01:41.168
 Final – 02:03.889 (→ 6th place)

Men's kayak singles 1.000 m
Emilio Merchán
 Qualifying heat – 03:36.591
 Semifinal – 03:40.263
 Final – 03:39.965 (→ 9th place)

Men's canoe singles 500 m
Jose Manuel Crespo
 Qualifying heat – 01:53.862
 Semifinal – 01:54.765 (→ did not advance)

Men's canoe singles 1.000 m
Jose Manuel Crespo
 Qualifying heat – 04:04.528
 Semifinal – 04:04.042 (→ did not advance)

Men's canoe doubles 500 m
José Alfredo Bea, David Mascató
 Qualifying heat – 01:44.973
 Semifinal – 01:45.677
 Final – 01:56.600 (→ 4th place)

Men's canoe doubles 1.000 m
José Alfredo Bea, David Mascató
 Qualifying heat – 03:37.697
 Semifinal – bye
 Final – 03:54.053 (→ 9th place)

Women's competition
Women's kayak singles 500 m
Teresa Portela
 Qualifying heat – 01:59.153
 Semifinal – 01:58.932 (→ did not advance)

Women's kayak doubles 500 m
Maria Isabel Garcia Suarez, Belen Sanchez
 Qualifying heat – 01:45.527
 Semifinal – 01:45.144
 Final – 02:04.208 (→ 7th place)

Women's kayak fours 500 m
Izaskun Aramburu, Beatriz Manchon, Ana María Penas, Belen Sanchez
 Qualifying heat – 01:35.298
 Semifinal – bye
 Final – 01:38.654 (→ 8th place)

Slalom

Men's competition
Men's kayak singles
Esteban Arakama
 Qualifying – 267.75 (→ did not advance) 
Carles Juanmartí
 Qualifying – 275.88 (→ did not advance)

Men's canoe singles
Jon Erguin
 Qualifying – 362.62 (→ did not advance)

Men's canoe doubles
Antonio Herreros, Marc Vicente
 Qualifying – 344.62 (→ did not advance)

Women's competition
Women's kayak singles
María Eizmendi
 Qualifying – 311.17
 Final – 276.55 (→ 14th place)

Cycling

Cross-country mountain bike
Men's competition
José Antonio Hermida
 Final – 2:11:42.91 (→ 4th place) 
Roberto Lezaun
 Final – 2:15:56.99 (→ 15th place)

Women's competition
Margarita Fullana
 Final – 1:49:57.39 (→  Bronze medal)
Silvia Rovira
 Final – 1:58:59.37 (→ 14th place)

Road cycling
Men's individual time trial
Abraham Olano
 Final – 0:58:31 (→ 4th place) 
Santos González Capilla
 Final – 0:59:03 (→ 8th place)

Men's road race
Óscar Freire
 Final – 5:30:46 (→ 17th place) 
Abraham Olano
 Final – 5:30:46 (→ 60th place) 
Juan Carlos Domínguez
 Final – DNF (→ no ranking)
Santos González Capilla
 Final – DNF (→ no ranking)
Miguel Ángel Martín Perdiguero
 Final – DNF (→ no ranking)

Women's individual time trial
Joane Somarriba Arrola
 Final – 0:43:06 (→ 5th place) 
Teodora Ruano
 Final – 0:44:37.36 (→ 18th place)

Women's road race
Joane Somarriba Arrola
 Final – 3:06:31 (→ 14th place) 
Fatima Blazquez Lozano
 Final – 3:10:33 (→ 33rd place) 
Mercedes Cagigas Amed
 Final – 3:28:29 (→ 48th place)

Track cycling
Men's sprint
José Antonio Villanueva
Qualifying – 10.556
First round – defeated Craig MacLean of Great Britain
1/8 finals – defeated Pavel Buráň of Czech Republic
Quarterfinal – lost to Florian Rousseau of France
Final 5-8 – 6th place

Men's individual pursuit
Antonio Tauler
Qualifying – 04:34.415 (→ did not advance)

Men's 1 km time trial
David Cabrero
Final – 01:07.710 (→ 15th place)

Men's point race
Juan Llaneras
Points – 14
Laps down – 0 (→ Gold medal)Men's keirinDavid Cabrero
First round – heat – 3; place – 3
Repechage – heat – 3; place – 1
Second round – heat – 2; place – 4 (→ did not advance)Men's Olympic sprintJosé Antonio Escuredo, José Antonio Villanueva and Salvador Meliá
Qualifying – 45.799 (→ did not advance)Men's team pursuitMiguel Alzamora, Isaac Gálvez, Antonio Tauler and José Francisco Jarque
Qualifying – 04:15.547 (did not advance)Men's MadisonJuan Llaneras and Isaac Gálvez
Final – 3 (→ 13th place)Women's point paceTeodora Ruano
Points – 10 (→ 7th place)

DivingMen's 3 metre springboardRafael Álvarez
 Preliminary – 377.55
 Semifinal – 201.06 – 578.61 (17th place, did not advance)Men's 3 metre springboardJose-Miguel Gil
 Preliminary – 318.72 (33rd place, did not advance)Men's 10 metre platformRuben Santos
 Preliminary – 300.9 (36th place, did not advance)Women's 10 metre platformSantos Leire
 Preliminary – 271.41 (27th place, did not advance)Women's 10 Metre PlatformDolores Sáez de Ibarra
 Preliminary – 283.41
 Semifinal – 163.11 – 446.52 (14th place, did not advance)

Equestrianism

Fencing

Four male fencers represented Spain in 2000.

Men's sabre
 Fernando Medina
 Jorge Pina
 Alberto Falcón

Men's team sabre
 Jorge Pina, Antonio García, Fernando Medina

Football

Men's tournament
Group play

Quarter-finals

Semi-finals

Gold medal match

Gymnastics

Men
Artistic

Women
Artistic
Team

Individual events

Handball

Field hockey

Men's team competitionPreliminary round (Group B): Spain — South Korea 1-1
 Spain — Poland 1-4
 Spain — Australia 2-2
 Spain — India 2-3
 Spain — Argentina 1-5Classification matches: 9th-12th place: Spain — Malaysia 1-0
 9th-10th place: Spain — Canada 3-0 → Ninth placeTeam roster Jaime Amat
 Pablo Amat
 Javier Arnau
 Jordi Casas
 Juan Dinarés
 Juan Escarré
 Francisco "Kiko" Fábregas
 Rodrigo Garza
 Bernardino Herrera
 Ramón Jufresa
 Joaquín Malgosa
 Xavier Ribas
 Josep Sánchez
 Ramón Sala
 Eduardo Tubau
 Pablo UsozHead coach: Antonio Forrellat

Women's team competitionPreliminary round (Group A): Spain — South Korea 0-0
 Spain — Australia 1-1
 Spain — Argentina 1-1
 Spain — Great Britain 0-2Medal round: Spain — China 0-0
 Spain — New Zealand 2-2
 Spain — Netherlands 1-2Bronze medal game: Spain — Netherlands 0-2 → Fourth placeTeam roster Amanda González
 Begoña Larzabal
 Cibeles Romero
 Elena Carrión
 Elena Urkizu
 Erdoitza Goikoetxea
 Lucía López
 María Carmen Barea
 Maider Tellería
 María del Carmen Martín
 María del Mar Feito
 Núria Camón
 Nuria Moreno
 Silvia Muñoz
 Sonia Barrio
 Sonia de IgnacioHead coach: Marc Lammers

Judo

Rhythmic gymnastics

Rowing

Qualification Legend: FA=Final A (medal); FB=Final B (non-medal); FC=Final C (non-medal); FD=Final D (non-medal); FE=Final E (non-medal); FF=Final F (non-medal); SA/B=Semifinals A/B; SC/D=Semifinals C/D; SE/F=Semifinals E/F; QF=Quarterfinals; R=Repechage

Sailing

Spain competed in nine events in the Sailing competition at the Sydney Olympics. In seven of the events, they finished in the top 10 but were unable to win a medal. This was the first time since 1972 that Spain failed to win an Olympic medal in sailing.
Men

Women

Open
Fleet racing

Match racing

Shooting

Four Spanish shooters (two men and two women) qualified to compete in the following events:
Men

Women

SwimmingMen's 50m freestyleEduardo Lorente
 Preliminary heat – 22.96 (→ did not advance)Men's 100m freestyleJavier Botello
 Preliminary heat – 50.87 (→ did not advance)Men's 1500m freestyleFrederik Hviid
 Preliminary heat – 15:14.37 (→ did not advance)

Teo Edo
 Preliminary heat – 15:32.01 (→ did not advance)Men's 200m butterflyJorge Pérez
 Preliminary heat – 02:00.15 (→ did not advance)Men's 100m backstrokeDavid Ortega
 Preliminary heat – 55.8
 Semifinal – 56.33 (→ did not advance)Men's 200m backstrokeGuillermo Mediano
 Preliminary heat – 02:03.45 (→ did not advance)Men's 200m individual medleyJordi Carrasco
 Preliminary heat – 02:02.89 (→ did not advance)Men's 400m individual medleyFrederik Hviid
 Preliminary heat – 04:21.63 (→ did not advance)Men's 4 × 100 m freestyleJorge Luis Ulibarri, Eduardo Lorente, Juan Benavides and Javier Botello
 Preliminary heat – 03:22.76 (→ did not advance)Men's 4 × 100 m medley relayDavid Ortega, Santiago Castellanos, Daniel Morales and Javier Botello
 Preliminary heat – 03:42.76 (→ did not advance)Women's 50m freestyleAna Belén Palomo
 Preliminary heat – 25.96 (→ did not advance)Women's 200m freestyleLaura Roca
 Preliminary heat – 02:03.37 (→ did not advance)Women's 400m freestyleAngels Bardina
 Preliminary heat – 04:17.55 (→ did not advance)Women's 100m butterflyMaría Peláez
 Preliminary heat – 01:01.47 (→ did not advance)Women's 200m butterflyMireia García
 Preliminary heat – 02:10.96
 Semifinal – 02:10.24 (→ did not advance)
María Peláez
 Preliminary heat – 02:14.66 (→ did not advance)Women's 200m breaststrokeLourdes Becerra
 Preliminary heat – DNS (→ did not advance)Women's 100m backstrokeNina Zhivanevskaya
 Preliminary heat – 01:01.97
 Semifinal – 01:01.41
 Final – 01:00.89 (→  Bronze medal)Women's 200m backstrokeNina Zhivanevskaya
 Preliminary heat – 02:11.60
 Semifinal – 02:11.93
 Final – 02:12.75 (→ 6th place) 
Ivette María
 Preliminary heat – 02:14.78
 Semifinal – 02:15.11 (→ did not advance)Women's 400m individual medleyLourdes Becerra
 Preliminary heat – 04:47.50 (→ did not advance)Women's 4 × 200 m freestyle relayAngels Bardina, Natalia Cabrerizo, Paula Carballido and Laura Roca
 Preliminary heat – 08:13.62 (→ did not advance)Women's 4 × 100 m medley relayMaría Carmen Collado, Mireia García, Ivette María and Laura Roca
 Preliminary heat – 04:15.54 (→ did not advance)

Synchronized swimmingDuetGemma Mengual, Paola Tirados
 Technical routine – 32.9
 Free routine – 61.62
 Final – 94.52 (8th place)

Taekwondo

Tennis

Triathlon

Three of Spain's four triathletes finished the inaugural Olympic triathlon. Ivan Rana was the only one to place in the top eight, with a fifth-place finish in the men's event.Women's competition:
Maribel Blanco — 2:06:37.84 (24th place)Men's competition:
Iván Raña — 1:49:10.88 (5th place)
Eneko Llanos — 1:50:48.35 (23rd place)
Jose Maria Merchan — did not finish

Volleyball

Men's team competitionPreliminary round (Group A) Defeated Egypt (3-0)
 Lost to Cuba (1-3)
 Lost to Australia (1-3) 
 Lost to Brazil (1-3)
 Lost to the Netherlands (1-3) → did not advance, ninth place overallTeam rosterCarlos Carreño
José Antonio Casilla
Enrique de la Fuente
Miguel Angel Falasca
José Luis Moltó
Rafael Pascual
Cosme Prenafeta
Juan Carlos Robles
Ernesto Rodríguez
Juan José Salvador
Luis Pedro Suela
Alexis ValidoHead coach: Raúl Lozano

Water polo

Men's tournament

Preliminary round: 2-2-1
Quarterfinal: defeated Croatia, 9-8
Semifinal: lost to Russia, 8-7
Bronze medal game: Lost to Yugoslavia, 8-3 → 4th placeTeam roster Ángel Andreo
 Daniel Ballart
 Daniel Moro
 Gabriel Hernández Paz
 Gustavo Marcos
 Iván Moro
 Javier Sánchez-Toril
 Jesús Rollán
 Jordi Sans
 Manuel Estiarte
 Pedro Francisco García
 Salvador Gómez
 Sergi Pedrerol

WeightliftingMenWomen'''

Notes

 Spanish Olympic Committee
Wallechinsky, David (2004). The Complete Book of the Summer Olympics (Athens 2004 Edition)''. Toronto, Canada. ISBN . 
International Olympic Committee (2001). The Results. Retrieved 12 November 2005.
Sydney Organising Committee for the Olympic Games (2001). Official Report of the XXVII Olympiad Volume 1: Preparing for the Games. Retrieved 20 November 2005.
Sydney Organising Committee for the Olympic Games (2001). Official Report of the XXVII Olympiad Volume 2: Celebrating the Games. Retrieved 20 November 2005.
Sydney Organising Committee for the Olympic Games (2001). The Results. Retrieved 20 November 2005.
International Olympic Committee website

References

Bibliography
 

Nations at the 2000 Summer Olympics
2000 Summer Olympics
Olympics